Karnala may refer to:

Karnala Bird Sanctuary, a bird sanctuary in Maharashtra
Karnala fort, a fort in Maharashtra